Persististrombus granulatus is a species of gastropods belonging to the family Strombidae.

The species is found in America.

References

Strombidae